The International Tennis Hall of Fame is located in Newport, Rhode Island, United States. It honors both players and other contributors to the sport of tennis. The complex, the former Newport Casino, includes a museum, grass tennis courts, an indoor tennis facility, a court tennis facility, and a theatre. The International Tennis Hall of Fame is a non-profit organization with the goal to preserve, celebrate, and inspire the sport of tennis around the world.

History

The hall of fame and museum are located in the Newport Casino, which was commissioned in 1879 by James Gordon Bennett Jr. as part of an exclusive resort for wealthy Newport summer residents. It was designed by Charles McKim along with Stanford White, who did the interiors. It is an example of Victorian Shingle Style architecture. In 1881, the Real Tennis Court (housing the National Tennis Club) and the Casino Theatre were constructed at the east end of the campus. The club was opened on July 1, 1880, after a six-month construction period and quickly became a fashionable venue for Newport summer residents. 

The United States Lawn Tennis Association held its first championships at the Newport Casino in 1881. The event was held annually through 1914, by which time tennis had become the key attraction at the resort. The championship was suspended during World War I.

But by the 1950s, the retreat was struggling financially, as tourism preferences changed. It was at risk of being demolished for redevelopment of modern retail space, but the building was purchased and saved by Jimmy and Candy Van Alen, wealthy Newport summer residents. A sportsman himself, in 1954, Jimmy Van Alen established the Tennis Hall of Fame and Museum in the Casino. The combination of tennis matches and the museum allowed the building to be saved. 

Van Alen intended the facility to be "a shrine to the ideals of the game", and was elected president of the hall in 1957. The International Tennis Hall of Fame was officially sanctioned by the United States Tennis Association at its foundation in 1954. It was recognized by the International Tennis Federation in 1986. The first Hall of Fame members were inducted in 1955; as of 2017, a total of 252 inductees from 23 countries have been recognized.

In 2015, Martina Hingis was appointed as the first Global Ambassador for the International Tennis Hall of Fame.

The current Board of Governors includes former professional tennis players Todd Martin, Stan Smith and Katrina Adams.

TeamFAME 
TeamFame is the International Tennis Hall of Fame's NJTL Chapter. TeamFAME: Future Aces Modeling Excellence, provides out-of-school activities to help the underserved community reach their goals, learn new skills, and change lives on and off the court. TeamFAME works to inspire future leaders through character, education, academic, enrichment, and healthy living. There are year long programs for kids, such as after school programs and summer tennis programs that run for 10 weeks in local neighborhoods. To learn more about TeamFAME visit the International Tennis Hall of Fame.

Collections

The museum houses a large collection of artifacts and memorabilia – including videos, photographs, audio recordings, tennis equipment and apparel, trophies, and art – highlighting the history of tennis from its origins up through the modern era. The collection is displayed year-round in the museum's  of exhibit space. The museum also offers several digital exhibits.

Awards

For a description of each award and a list of its recipients, see footnote
Chairman's Award 
Davis Cup Award of Excellence
Eugene L. Scott Award
Fed Cup Award of Excellence
Golden Achievement Award
Joseph F. Cullman 3rd Award 
Samuel Hardy Award
Tennis Educational Merit Award

Infosys Hall of Fame Open
The Hall of Fame hosts several tournaments, including the Infosys Hall of Fame Open in July. The Infosys Hall of Fame Open is a part of the US Open Series, as well as being part of the men's ATP World Tour, the tournament is the only grass court event in North America. Top male players come to Newport directly from Wimbledon to compete for the Van Alen Cup at the International Tennis Hall of Fame. Past champions include Americans John Isner (4x Hall of Fame Open Champion) and Mardy Fish, two-time champion Fabrice Santoro of France, and Australia's Lleyton Hewitt. During the tournament, Tennis Hall of Famers are officially inducted in front of family, friends, fans, and fellow members of the Tennis Hall of Fame.

Members
Being inducted into the Tennis Hall of Fame is the ultimate honor in tennis. It represents the sum of one's achievements and contributions as being among the most important and transformative in tennis history. There is a seven-step process to be inducted into the Tennis Hall of Fame. A player or contributor must be nominated to be inducted, and then the national enshrinement committee reviews their eligibility. Once it is decided if they are eligible, the committee reviews if the nominee will be considered by voters. After review, the voting begins; both group and fan voting takes place. A nominee must receive at least 75% from the Official Voting Group result or a combined total of 75% or more from the Official Voting Group result and any bonus percentage points they earn through the Fan Vote. Votes are tallied by an independent accounting firm. The class induction is announced in January, and the new class is inducted into the Tennis Hall of Fame in July at the International Tennis Hall of Fame. 

For further details, see footnote
For a list of inductees—alphabetically, by country, and by year of induction—see footnote
Note: Inductees are listed below in two categories (Player category and Contributor category).''

Player category

*note -  Bob Hewitt of South Africa was inducted into the Tennis Hall of Fame in 1992, but he was suspended indefinitely in 2012 and expelled from the Hall in 2016 after being convicted of child sexual offences.

Contributor category

Global Ambassador category

Nationalities

See also

 Tenniseum
 List of sports awards honoring women

References

External links

  
 11 Intriguing Items at the International Tennis Hall of Fame article
 International Tennis Hall of Fame article
 International Tennis Hall of Fame digital exhibits 
 Hall of Fame Open 

 

Hall of Fame
History of tennis
Tennis venues in Rhode Island
Sports museums in Rhode Island
Sports venues in Rhode Island
Halls of fame in Rhode Island
Sports halls of fame
Museums in Newport, Rhode Island
Landmarks in Rhode Island
Buildings and structures in Newport, Rhode Island
Sports awards honoring women
Awards established in 1955
Sports organizations established in 1954
1954 establishments in Rhode Island